The 1974–75 San Diego Conquistadors season was the 3rd and final season of the Conquistadors in the American Basketball Association. The team floundered, on the court and in the box office, with Wilt Chamberlain having left the team after the previous season. They finished 5th in points per game at 109.9, but dead last in points allowed at 115.5 per game. Notably, they played the New York Nets in a 4 overtime game on February 14, winning 176–166. A victory over Virginia on March 12 turned out to be their last as they lost 11 straight games to end the season, as they finished in dead last by 7 games. After the season, Frank Goldberg (who formerly held ownership interest in the Denver Nuggets) bought the San Diego Conquistadors, assuming the $2 million team debt. They soon renamed the team, becoming the San Diego Sails. However, they folded 11 games into the season.

Roster   
 12 George Adams - Small forward
 25 Tim Bassett - Power forward
 8 Lee Davis - Power forward
 9 Scott English - Small forward
 5 Travis Grant - Small forward
 6 Billy Harris - Shooting guard
 2 Warren Jabali - Shooting guard
 13 Stew Johnson - Power forward
 3 Caldwell Jones - Center
 10 Bo Lamar - Point guard
 2 Greg Lee - Point guard
 4 Bob Nash - Small forward
 14 Jimmy O'Brien - Point guard
 -- Reggie Royals - Center
 8 Art Williams - Point guard

Final standings

Western Division

Awards and honors
1975 ABA All-Star Game selection (game played on January 28, 1975)
 Caldwell Jones

References

External links
 RememberTheABA.com 1974–75 regular season and playoff results
 San Diego Conquistadors page

San Diego Conquistadors
San Diego Conquistadors
San Diego Conquistadors, 1974–75
San Diego Conquistadors, 1974–75